Troisvaux is a commune in the Pas-de-Calais department in the Hauts-de-France region of France.

Geography

Population

Places of interest
 The trappist abbey of Belval
 The church of St. Vaast, dating from the fifteenth century.
 The church of St. Jude and St. Simon, dating from the nineteenth century.

See also
 Communes of the Pas-de-Calais department

References

External links

 The Abbey of Belval at Troisvaux 
 The CWGC communal cemetery

Communes of Pas-de-Calais